Andre Ewers (born 7 June 1995) is a Jamaican athlete. He competed in the men's 200 metres event at the 2019 World Athletics Championships.

References

External links

1995 births
Living people
Jamaican male sprinters
Place of birth missing (living people)
World Athletics Championships athletes for Jamaica
Florida State Seminoles men's track and field athletes